Hasenburger Mühlenbach (also: Hasenburgerbach) is a river of Lower Saxony, Germany. It flows into the Ilmenau near Lüneburg.

References

Rivers of Lower Saxony
Rivers of Germany